Shawn Hicks (born 10 July 1995) is a South African-born New Zealand cricketer who plays for Otago. He made his first-class debut on 17 December 2015 in the 2015–16 Plunket Shield. He made his List A debut on 27 December 2015 in the 2015–16 Ford Trophy. In June 2018, he was awarded a contract with Otago for the 2018–19 season.

See also
 List of Auckland representative cricketers

References

External links
 

1995 births
Living people
New Zealand cricketers
Auckland cricketers
Otago cricketers
People from Centurion, Gauteng
South African emigrants to New Zealand
Naturalised citizens of New Zealand
Sportspeople from Gauteng